Oxypiloidea nigerica is a species of praying mantis in the family Hymenopodidae. It is native to Nigeria.

See also
List of mantis genera and species

References

N
Mantodea of Africa
Insects of West Africa